Mortimer Sackville-West, 1st Baron Sackville (22 September 1820 – 1 October 1888), was a British peer and court official.

Sackville-West was the fourth son of George Sackville-West, 5th Earl De La Warr, and Elizabeth Sackville, 1st Baroness Buckhurst, younger daughter and co-heir of John Sackville, 3rd Duke of Dorset. On the death of his kinsman Charles Sackville-Germain, 5th Duke of Dorset, in 1843, the dukedom and its subsidiary titles became extinct. Large parts of the Sackville estates passed to the West family through Elizabeth. The Sackville-Wests inherited parts of the estates by arrangement, notably the estate of Knole Park in Kent.

During his career Sackville-West held several high appointments within the Royal household. In 1876 he was raised to the peerage as Baron Sackville, of Knole in the County of Kent. The peerage was created with special remainder, failing heirs male of his body, to his younger brothers Lionel and William Edward. He died in 1888, aged 68, and was succeeded in the barony according to the special remainder by his younger brother Lionel.

References 

 Kidd, Charles, Williamson, David (editors). Debrett's Peerage and Baronetage (1990 edition). New York: St Martin's Press, 1990, 
 

1820 births
1888 deaths
Barons in the Peerage of the United Kingdom
Younger sons of earls
Younger sons of barons
Mortimer Sackville-West, 01 Baron Sackville
Gentlemen Ushers
Mortimer
Peers of the United Kingdom created by Queen Victoria